Paragomphus genei  (Common Hooktail) is a species of dragonfly in the family Gomphidae.

Distribution and status
It is found in Algeria, Botswana, Cameroon, Central African Republic, the Democratic Republic of the Congo, Ivory Coast, Egypt, Ethiopia, Ghana, Guinea, Kenya, Liberia, Malawi, Morocco, Mozambique, Namibia, Nigeria, Sierra Leone, Somalia, South Africa, Sudan, Tanzania, Togo, Uganda, Zambia, Zimbabwe, and possibly Burundi. Also lives in the south of Iberian Peninsula in Europe.

Habitat
Its natural habitats are subtropical or tropical moist lowland forests, dry savanna, moist savanna, subtropical or tropical dry shrubland, subtropical or tropical moist shrubland, rivers and intermittent rivers in the mediterranean area, freshwater lakes, and freshwater marshes.

Identification

References

 Tarboton, W.R.; Tarboton, M. (2015). A guide to dragonflies and damselflies of South Africa. .

Gomphidae
Taxonomy articles created by Polbot
Insects described in 1841